Gaston Thubé (16 October 1876 – 22 June 1974) was a French sailor who competed in the 1912 Summer Olympics. He was a crew member on the French boat Mac Miche, which won the gold medal in the 6 metre class.

References

External links
 

1876 births
1974 deaths
French male sailors (sport)
Olympic sailors of France
Olympic gold medalists for France
Olympic medalists in sailing
Medalists at the 1912 Summer Olympics
Sailors at the 1912 Summer Olympics – 6 Metre